Sprinter (stylized as SPRINTER) is a hybrid rail (light rail with some features similar to commuter rail) line operating in the North County area of San Diego County between the cities of Escondido and Oceanside, California, United States. The service uses the  Escondido Branch of the San Diego Northern Railroad. Station platforms were constructed for the line's fifteen stations serving the cities of Oceanside, Vista, San Marcos, and Escondido. The line provides service to California State University, San Marcos and Palomar College. Sprinter service operates every 30 minutes and is targeted towards students and commuters.

The Sprinter is operated by the North County Transit District, the area's public transit agency. The agency also operates the Coaster commuter rail line and the BREEZE Bus routes. At Oceanside Transit Center, the Sprinter connects to three commuter rail lines (the Coaster, the Metrolink Orange County Line, and the Metrolink Inland Empire–Orange County Line), as well as to Amtrak's Pacific Surfliner regional rail line.

A 2007 study by the San Diego Association of Governments (SANDAG) predicted that the Sprinter would reduce road trips by 5,000 a day (a round trip by car would be two road trips). It also predicted over 11,000 riders (trips) per day by the end of the first year. Ridership numbers did climb after opening, reaching just under 8,000 people per day as of March 2008.

History 
The Sprinter is the first passenger train service along the Escondido Branch since the Santa Fe Railroad discontinued passenger service in 1946. Originally built in 1888, the entire line had to be rebuilt to accommodate more traffic and be elevated because the line runs along a river.

The funding for Sprinter originated with the TransNet Tax (Proposition C) measure passed by San Diego County voters in 1987 to relieve traffic congestion. A third of the tax was dedicated to mass transit. The $477 million project also was funded through a $152 million Full Funding Grant Agreement from the Federal Transit Administration.

NCTD purchased the line in 1992 from the Santa Fe Railroad. Construction started on the line in 2005 and was scheduled for completion in December 2007. The Sprinter was previewed on December 28, 2007,  with full revenue service scheduled to begin on January 13, 2008. Opening was delayed due to safety and other concerns, and began on March 9, 2008.

Sprinter was the least expensive rail project per mile of 10 rail projects built or planned in California in 2005. American Public Works Association (APWA) awarded Sprinter the Transportation Project of the Year for projects valued over $75 million.

Service 
The Sprinter runs every 30 minutes in both directions seven days a week, from approximately 4 am to 9 pm. Trains run later on Friday and Saturday evenings, to approximately 10:30pm (westbound to Oceanside), and to approximately 11:30pm (eastbound to Escondido). Saturday/Sunday/Holiday trains operate every 30 minutes between 10 am and 6 pm and hourly before 10 am and after 6 pm.

Stations 

The Sprinter serves a total of 15 stations, including the two termini at Oceanside and Escondido. Three of these stations are transit centers – the two termini, Oceanside Transit Center and Escondido Transit Center, along with the Vista Transit Center station.

Fares 
A one-way trip on the Sprinter costs $2.50 per rider, $1.25 for Senior (60+)/Disabled/Medicare riders (children under 5 years old ride for free; up to 3).

In addition, riders can buy passes (e.g. Regional 24-Hour Pass, Regional 30-Day Pass) which allow for unlimited travel not only on the Sprinter, but on other NCTD and MTS systems, such as the San Diego Trolley, and Breeze and MTS buses, for the duration of that pass. Rides on those systems, plus the Coaster commuter rail, and express buses, require a "RegionPlus" pass.

Pronto fare system 

The Sprinter, along with all other NCTD and MTS services, utilizes the Pronto contactless fare system introduced in September 2021; succeededing the first-generation Compass Card system." The Pronto fare system allows for a tap-on, tap-off approach, so riders on the Sprinter tap-on when entering the station platform (using one of the station's validators), and tap-off when arriving at the destination stop, in order to deduct the correct fare. Physical Pronto cards can be purchased at vending machines at NCTD stations or at customer service centers; electronic versions can be purchased through the website or through the mobile applications.

Ridership 
While pre-opening studies of the Sprinter line projected an average weekday ridership of 11,000, average weekday ridership in 2012 was 7,800, 70% of the original projected daily ridership. For 2012, this corresponded to 2.4 million annual ridership. However, the average weekday ridership for the Sprinter in the first quarter of 2013 was 8,500 according to the American Public Transportation Association (APTA) Transit Ridership Report for Q1 2013, which is 77% of the original projected daily ridership for the system.

Rolling stock 

Sprinter service is operated with Desiro-class diesel multiple units (DMU) manufactured by Siemens in Germany and widely used by main-line regional railways. Twelve married pairs of Siemens VT642 Desiro DMUs were delivered to the Escondido Transit Center in August 2006. The vehicles were in acceptance testing in California during the early part of 2007. The passenger trains are not FRA-compliant for operation in association with freight trains; therefore freight operations on the route are not permitted during passenger operations. For this reason some publications, including the American Public Transportation Association, refer to this line as light rail but it does not conform with the usual understanding of that term.

Future service plans 
Being a relatively new transit service, future development plans for the Sprinter are currently focused on increasing the frequency of the service to 20 minutes per train departure, from the Sprinter's current 30-minute schedule. An increased schedule will require more double-tracking of the Sprinter rail line as currently only 9.6 miles (44%) of the Sprinter's rail line is double-tracked. The preferred alternative project for more double-tracking on the rail line involves increased double-tracking around Crouch St. station through College Blvd. station, and around Palomar College station through Nordahl Rd. station. It is projected that this project will require six years to reach completion.

Additionally, NCTD would like to implement Sprinter Express train service that would stop at only the five stations (Oceanside Transit Center, El Camino Real, Vista Transit Center, San Marcos Civic Center, and Escondido Transit Center) with the greatest ridership along the route. The Express service would use freight track east of San Marcos Civic Center station to bypass a station and an eastern portion of the regular route in order to further reduce travel times between termini.

Longer-term, SANDAG's 2050 Regional Transportation Plan projects one extension of the Sprinter by 2050. The extension would be from the Sprinter's current eastern terminus at the Escondido Transit Center, south (presumably along S Centre City Parkway) to the Escondido Westfield Mall/Del Lago Transit Center. No other extensions of the Sprinter (e.g. to San Diego Zoo Safari Park, or to McClellan–Palomar Airport) are included in the plan.

Criticism 
The Sprinter has encountered some dissatisfaction in northern San Diego County. For example, business owners in Oceanside have attributed flooding in November 2007 and January 2008 to the Sprinter, since its construction raised railroad beds and narrowed creeks.  Some have also criticized the limited schedule. In response to the limited schedule, NCTD expanded Friday and Saturday Night service in 2011, the last trips leaving out of Escondido (Westbound) at 10:33pm and out of Oceanside (Eastbound) at 11:33pm.

Incidents

Accidents 
On March 11, 2008, just two days after the first passengers were carried, a westbound Sprinter train struck a man who was lying on the tracks under a State Route 78 bridge in San Marcos.  It was not immediately clear if the man was aware of the approach of the train. However, the man, who was covered by a sleeping bag at the time he was struck, spoke of suicide while in the emergency room.

On March 23, 2012, a man was struck by a westbound Sprinter train at the West Mission Road and North Pacific Street crossing.  The victim's death was ruled a suicide by the San Diego County medical examiner's office.  The operator of the train applied the brakes and sounded the horn, but was unable to avoid the collision. The victim died at the scene.

Service suspension (2013) 
On February 28, 2013, the California Public Utilities Commission conducted an inspection of the Sprinter vehicles. During that inspection, the CPUC discovered accelerated patterns of wear on the central axle brakes of all 12 vehicles. As a result, on March 8, 2013, NCTD suspended service on the entire line. NCTD established bus replacement service for the duration of the Sprinter service interruption which lasted 70 days. The Sprinter resumed regular service on May 18, 2013, with the last day of the supplemental express bus service on May 24.

See also 

 Transportation in San Diego County
 Coaster (commuter rail)
 San Diego Trolley

References

External links 

 

North County Transit District
Passenger rail transportation in California
Public transportation in San Diego County, California
Light rail in California
California railroads
Escondido, California
Railway services introduced in 2008
2008 establishments in California